Saki is a 1962 British television series which was produced by Granada Television and aired on ITV. It was an anthology series adapting the works of writer Saki (born Hector Hugh Munro). Eight episodes were produced.

Unlike many British television series of the 1960s, the programme survives intact.

Credits

Cast
Martita Hunt as Lady Bastable
William Mervyn as Sir Hector
Mark Burns as Clovis Sangrail
Fenella Fielding as Mary Drakmanton
Richard Vernon as The Major
Rosamund Greenwood as Veronique Brimley-Bomefield

Credits

Producer - Philip Mackie
Adapted by - Edward Boyd & Hugh Leonard
Script Editor - Gerald Savory
Designers - Peter Phillips, Roy Stonehouse & Darrell Lass
Directors - Gordon Flemyng & Silvio Narizzano

References

External links
Saki on IMDb

1962 British television series debuts
1962 British television series endings
1960s British drama television series
English-language television shows
Black-and-white British television shows
1960s British anthology television series